School Bus is a 2016 Malayalam family thriller film directed by Rosshan Andrrews, starring Kunchacko Boban, Jayasurya and Aparna Gopinath in the lead roles. The screenplay is written by Bobby–Sanjay.

Plot 
Joseph (Jayasurya) and Aparna (Aparna Gopinath) with their two children (Aakash Muraleedheeran and Angelleena Rosshan), symbolise a modern nuclear family. Joseph's son Ajoy often gets into a lot of trouble at school and so his father Joseph, a mild tempered business man often scolds him. The working and quarrelling parents, having no time to spare with the kids, lead the children to hide things away from them in the fear of getting scolded. The children, at first, takes into solving problems by themselves but later it goes out of their hands. Ajoy takes a flight to escape the wrath of everyone and finally lands in the middle of a deep forest. The story later revolves around the quest for Ajoy whereby his parents realise their mistakes and unite to find him. The two children are the main characters of this film which is based on a real life incident. Sub Inspector R Gopakumar (Kunchacko Boban) is a police officer who comes to enquire the missing of Ajoy. The film portrays the less stronger bonds in the modern nuclear families and also the attitude of the school authorities which put the students under pressure against even smaller mistakes committed by them.

Cast 

 Kunchacko Boban as SI Gopakumar
 Jayasurya as Joseph
 Aparna Gopinath as Aparna
 Aakash Muraleedharan as Ajoy Joseph (voiced by Gourav Menon)
 Angelleena Rosshan as Angelina
 Ann Benjamin as Nimmy
 Baiju Ezhupunna as Jabbar
 Jeni Susan as Teacher
 Manju Sunichan as Annie
 Baiju VK as Navaneeth's father
 Nandhu as ASI Mohan
 Albert Alex as Constable Salim
 Abhija Sivakala as Syamala
 Minon as Kannan
 Vijayakumar as SI Babu
 Rizwan M Shiras as Class Leader

Production 
C. K. Muraleedharan of 3 Idiots (2009) and PK (2015) was signed as the cinematographer. In fact, Muraleedharan's son and Rosshan's daughter are acting as Jayasurya's children in the movie. Apart from Jayasurya and Aparna, Kunchacko Boban too plays a key role in the movie. Filming started on 10 February 2016 and finished in late April 2016. Actor Jayasurya did the role for free and did not ask for remuneration because he felt the film had a great message.

Critical response 
The Times Of India rated the film 3 out of 5 stars saying that "With barely two-hours of runtime, School Bus is a movie that can be enjoyed by both kids and adults alike and has also a social message that accompanies every Bobby–Sanjay duo's film". sify gave the film 3 out of 5 and stated "School Bus has its fine moments and though the story goes along predictable lines, it can connect with the family audience. It could have been better, but even in the current form, it's a fine watch". filmibeat gave it 3 out of 5 and wrote " School Bus is a decent, classy family thriller, recommended for the family audiences". Behindwoods said that "The movie is a good watch for children and also will leave deep thoughts in parents".

References

External links 
 

2016 films
2010s Malayalam-language films
2016 thriller films
Indian thriller films
Films directed by Rosshan Andrrews